Russians Among Us: Sleeper Cells, Ghost Stories, and the Hunt for Putin's Spies is a 2020 nonfiction book by Gordon Corera about the Russian Illegals Program. It discusses the long-term infiltration and espionage efforts by the Russian government and the individual spies, as well as the American efforts to apprehend and convict the spies.

References

2020 non-fiction books
American non-fiction books
Non-fiction books about espionage
Books about Russia
HarperCollins books